Jaakkola is a Finnish surname. Notable people with the surname include:

 Anssi Jaakkola (born 1987), Finnish footballer
 Jalmari Jaakkola (1885–1964), Finnish historian
 Jyri Jaakkola (1977–2010), Finnish human rights activist

Finnish-language surnames